Edward C. Shannon (June 24, 1870 – May 20, 1946) was the 15th lieutenant governor of Pennsylvania from 1931 to 1935.

Biography
Edward Caswell Shannon was born in Phoenixville, Pennsylvania, on June 24, 1870, and grew up in Columbia, Pennsylvania.  He studied metallurgical chemistry at Lehigh University and Lafayette College.  He later completed a course in metallurgical chemistry in the laboratory of the Phoenix Iron Company, and then worked as a chemist and blast furnace superintendent in the iron and steel industries.  In 1899 he married Maud Radcliffe Lucas (1877-1943).  Shannon later worked as treasurer and general manager of Lucas Manufacturing, a clothes-making business in Columbia owned by his wife's family.

His military career began in 1889, when he enlisted in Company C, 4th Infantry Regiment, Pennsylvania National Guard.  He advanced through the noncommissioned officer ranks and obtained a commission as a second lieutenant in 1893.  He had attained the rank of captain and command of a company by the time he volunteered to serve in the Spanish–American War.

Shannon remained in the National Guard, and by 1915 had become commander of the 4th Infantry with the rank of colonel.  He commanded his regiment on the Mexican border during the 1916 Pancho Villa Expedition.  During World War I he continued in command of his regiment, which combined with other units and federalized as the 111th Infantry, 28th Infantry Division.  During the war Shannon earned the nickname "Two Yard" because of the reputation he developed for leading his men from the front ("two yards" ahead) during their attacks on German positions.  Shannon received the Distinguished Service Medal at the end of the war.

After World War I Shannon was promoted to brigadier general as commander of Pennsylvania's 1st Infantry Brigade.  He later commanded the 52nd Cavalry Brigade.

In 1919 he was elected prothonotary of Lancaster County.  From 1930 to 1935 he served as lieutenant governor.  Shannon unsuccessfully sought the Republican nomination for governor in 1934.

From 1933 to 1939 Shannon served as major general and commander of the 28th Infantry Division.  He succeeded William G. Price Jr., and was succeeded by Edward Martin.  During World War II Shannon was chairman of his local draft board.

Shannon died in Columbia on May 20, 1946.  He was buried at Laurel Hill Memorial Gardens in Columbia.

References

External links
 The Political Graveyard

1870 births
1946 deaths
People from Phoenixville, Pennsylvania
People from Columbia, Pennsylvania
Lieutenant Governors of Pennsylvania
Pennsylvania Republicans
United States Army generals
National Guard (United States) generals
American military personnel of the Spanish–American War
Recipients of the Distinguished Service Medal (US Army)
Burials in Pennsylvania
United States Army personnel of World War I
Military personnel from Pennsylvania